Cousineau is a surname. Notable people with the surname include:

 Claude Cousineau (born 1950), Canadian politician
 Guy Cousineau (born 1937), Canadian politician
 Léa Cousineau, Canadian politician
 Marcel Cousineau (born 1973), Canadian ice hockey player
 Marie-Hélène Cousineau, Canadian film director and producer
 Philémon Cousineau (1874–1959), Canadian politician
 Phil Cousineau (born 1952), American author, screenwriter and filmmaker
 René Cousineau (1930–2002), Canadian politician
 Tom Cousineau (born 1957), American pro football player
 Tony Cousineau, American professional poker player